Die Zwei und die Dame (German: Two and a Lady) is a 1926 German silent comedy crime film directed by Alwin Neuß and starring Agnes Esterhazy, Bernhard Goetzke and Henry Stuart. It was based on a novel by Sven Elvestad. It premiered in Berlin on 12 March 1926.

Cast
 Agnes Esterhazy as Sonja 
 Bernhard Goetzke as Lawyer Aage Gade 
 Henry Stuart as Polizeileutnant Helmersen 
 Karl Platen as Polizeirat Krag 
 Albert von Kersten as Apache 
 Gyula Szőreghy as Komplize 
 Elly Leffler   
 Robert Leffler

References

Bibliography
 Grange, William. Cultural Chronicle of the Weimar Republic. Scarecrow Press, 2008.

External links

1926 films
1920s crime comedy films
Films of the Weimar Republic
German silent feature films
Films directed by Alwin Neuß
Films based on Norwegian novels
German crime comedy films
German black-and-white films
UFA GmbH films
1926 comedy films
Silent crime comedy films
1920s German films
1920s German-language films